Novo Selo is a village in Croatia, administratively located in the Town of Slunj, in Karlovac County.

References

Geography of Croatia
Populated places in Karlovac County